Ahmed Hussein-Suale (5 December 1987 – 16 January 2019) was a Ghanaian undercover investigative journalist and an associate of fellow Ghanaian investigative journalist Anas Aremeyaw Anas. He died on Wednesday, 16 January 2019 when unidentified men on motorbikes shot him three times, twice in the chest and once in his neck in his vehicle.

Notable investigative works

Ahmed was a member of investigative firm Tiger Eye Private Investigations which investigated corruption in the Ghana Football Association named Number 12 which led to the removal of office and a lifetime ban of its President Kwesi Nyantakyi. In response, Kennedy Agyapong – a Ghanaian member of parliament – called for retaliation against Hussein-Suale.

He was also part of an investigative journalism piece in collaboration with the BBC into human body parts sold for ritual magic in Malawi.

Assassination
Ahmed was murdered on 16 January 2019 in his vehicle by two unidentified men on motorbikes. He was shot twice in the chest and once in the neck.

On 16 January 2020, a renowned international journalist, Guillaume Perrier published findings of a private investigation into the murder of Ahmed Hussein Suale as part of Forbidden Stories. He alleges that the Ghana Police Service failed to follow up on a key lead.

References

External links
 Joel Gunter, "Murder in Accra: The life and death of Ahmed Hussein-Suale", BBC News, 30 January 2019
Ahmed Hussein-Suale Divela at the Committee to Protect Journalists

1987 births
2019 deaths
Murder in Ghana
Corruption in Ghana
People from Accra
Ghanaian anti-corruption activists
Assassinated Ghanaian journalists
2019 murders in Ghana
2019 in Ghana
Ghanaian investigative journalists